Lucia Banci (born May 20, 1954) is an Italian chemist who is a professor at the University of Florence. Her research considers structural biology and biological nuclear magnetic resonance, with a focus on the role of metal ions in biological systems.

Early life and education 
Banci was an undergraduate student at the University of Florence. Her interest in magnetic resonance spectroscopy started with electron paramagnetic resonance, which can be used to study molecules that contain unpaired electrons. Bacni remained at the University of Florence for postdoctoral research, and received tenure in 1983.

Research and career 
Banci has studied the role of metal ions in biological processes. She extensively developed nuclear magnetic resonance spectroscopy for biological systems, and made use of it to better design and optimise vaccines. She founded the Centro Risonanze Magnetiche (CERM), a magnetic resonance centre in Italy, where she studies globular proteins. Her research resulted in the development of the Meningococcal vaccine.

In 2020, Banci oversaw the installation of the world's first 1.2 GHz nuclear magnetic resonance system. The ultra-high field system can provide information on intrinsically disordered proteins. The instrument makes use of low-temperature superconductors – high-temperature superconductors hybrid magnet technologies. During the COVID-19 pandemic, Banci used nuclear magnetic resonance to determine the structure of SARS-CoV-2 and how it could be treated with medicine.

Awards and honours 
 1994 Italian Chemical Society Raffaele Nasini Medal 
 2012 Elected member of European Molecular Biology Organization
 2014 Appointed to European Molecular Biology Laboratory Council
 2014 Elected to the Academia Europaea
 2015 International Union of Pure and Applied Chemistry Distinguished Women in Chemistry Award
 2015 Fiorino d’Oro della Città di Firenze
 2017 Instruct Bertini Award for Integrated Structural Biology
 2017 Bruker Ivano Bertini Award
 2018 National Institute for Infectious Diseases Lazzaro Spallanzani Mother Science Award
 2020 Honorary member of the National Magnetic Resonance Society of India
 2022 Accademia dei Lincei Luigi Tartufari Prize

Selected publications

References 

Living people
1954 births
20th-century Italian chemists
20th-century Italian women scientists
University of Florence alumni
Academic staff of the University of Florence
Members of the European Molecular Biology Organization
Members of Academia Europaea